Wilhelm Meisl (26 December 1895 in Vienna – 12 June 1968 in Locarno) was an Austrian-Jewish sports journalist in the 20th century. He was the brother of Austrian national football manager Hugo Meisl.

Meisl's writings did much to transform how football was perceived and played throughout continental Europe. In 1955, he coined the phrase 'The Whirl' to describe the play of his brother's Austrian 'Wunderteam' of the 1930s. He wrote: "We must free our soccer youth from the shackles of playing to order, along rails as it were. We must give them ideas and encourage them to develop their own".

Meisl's early career showed an inclination toward sports and participation. He played amateur football as a goalkeeper in Vienna, and was even selected for the national side by his brother. He played tennis, boxing, swam, played water polo and later coached the Swedish side Hammarby Fotboll for two seasons from 1923.  He completed legal studies in the early 1920s but his career was in print, working for a Berlin newspaper (Vossische Zeitung) from 1924 to 1933 before establishing himself as an astute author and editor. His work was also part of the literature event in the art competition at the 1928 Summer Olympics.

Following the Nazis' seizure of power in Germany, he emigrated to the United Kingdom in January, 1934 and continued as a journalist. He worked in the press department of the British Olympic Committee prior to the 1936 Summer Olympics in Berlin, joined the British Army, and was a staff member of the Foreign Office.

References

External links
Zeit.de: Dr Willy Meisl - 70 Jahre alt 

Austrian Jews
Austrian footballers
Austria international footballers
Jewish footballers
Austrian football managers
1895 births
1968 deaths
Austrian emigrants to the United Kingdom
Hammarby Fotboll managers
Jewish emigrants from Nazi Germany to the United Kingdom
British Army personnel of World War II
Footballers from Vienna
British people of Austrian-Jewish descent
Austrian people of Jewish descent
British sports journalists
Association football goalkeepers
Olympic competitors in art competitions
20th-century Austrian journalists